The year 2010 is the 22nd year in the history of Shooto, a mixed martial arts promotion based in Japan. In 2010 Shooto held 28 events beginning with, Shooto: The Way of Shooto 1: Like a Tiger, Like a Dragon.

Title fights

Events list

Shooto: The Way of Shooto 1: Like a Tiger, Like a Dragon

Shooto: The Way of Shooto 1: Like a Tiger, Like a Dragon was an event held on January 23, 2010 at Korakuen Hall in Tokyo, Japan.

Results

Shooto: Gig North 5

Shooto: Gig North 5 was an event held on February 14, 2010 at Zepp Sapporo in Sapporo, Hokkaido, Japan.

Results

Shooto: Trilogy 1

Shooto: Trilogy 1 was an event held on February 21, 2010 at Southernpia Hakata in Hakata-ku, Fukuoka.

Results

Shooto: Shooting Disco 11: Tora Tora Tora!

Shooto: Shooting Disco 11: Tora Tora Tora! was an event held on February 27, 2010 at Shinjuku Face in Tokyo, Japan.

Results

Shooto: Spirit 2010 Spring

Shooto: Spirit 2010 Spring was an event held on March 7, 2010 at Accel Hall in Sendai, Miyagi, Japan.

Results

Shooto: The Way of Shooto 2: Like a Tiger, Like a Dragon

Shooto: The Way of Shooto 2: Like a Tiger, Like a Dragon was an event held on March 22, 2010 at Korakuen Hall in Tokyo, Japan.

Results

Shooto: Border: Season 2: Vibration

Shooto: Border: Season 2: Vibration was an event held on March 28, 2010 at Hirano Ward Community Hall in Osaka, Kansai, Japan.

Results

Shooto: Grapplingman 10

Shooto: Grapplingman 10 was an event held on April 4, 2010 at Mamakari Forum in Okayama, Japan.

Results

Shooto: Gig Tokyo 4

Shooto: Gig Tokyo 4 was an event held on April 24, 2010 at Shinjuku Face in Tokyo, Japan.

Results

Shooto: Kitazawa Shooto Vol. 3

Shooto: Kitazawa Shooto Vol. 3 was an event held on May 9, 2010 at Kitazawa Town Hall in Tokyo, Japan.

Results

Shooto: Grapplingman 11

Shooto: Grapplingman 11 was an event held on May 16, 2010 at Hiroshima Industrial Hall in Hiroshima, Japan.

Results

Shooto: The Way of Shooto 3: Like a Tiger, Like a Dragon

Shooto: The Way of Shooto 3: Like a Tiger, Like a Dragon was an event held on May 30, 2010 at Tokyo Dome City Hall in Tokyo, Japan.

Results

Shooto: Shooting Disco 12: Stand By Me

Shooto: Shooting Disco 12: Stand By Me was an event held on June 6, 2010 at Shinjuku Face in Tokyo, Japan.

Results

Shooto: Gig Central 20

Shooto: Gig Central 20 was an event held on June 13, 2010 at Zepp Nagoya in Nagoya, Aichi, Japan.

Results

Shooto: Spirit 2010 Summer

Shooto: Spirit 2010 Summer was an event held on June 27, 2010 at Accel Hall in Sendai, Miyagi, Japan.

Results

Shooto: Gig Saitama 2

Shooto: Gig Saitama 2 was an event held on July 4, 2010 at Pal City Civic Hall in Shiki, Saitama, Japan.

Results

Shooto: The Way of Shooto 4: Like a Tiger, Like a Dragon

Shooto: The Way of Shooto 4: Like a Tiger, Like a Dragon was an event held on July 19, 2010 at Korakuen Hall in Tokyo, Japan.

Results

Shooto: Gig Tokyo 5

Shooto: Gig Tokyo 5 was an event held on August 7, 2010 at Shinjuku Face in Tokyo, Japan.

Results

Shooto: Border: Season 2: Rhythm

Shooto: Border: Season 2: Rhythm was an event held on August 15, 2010 at Hirano Ward Community Hall in Osaka, Kansai, Japan.

Results

Shooto: Gig North 6

Shooto: Gig North 6 was an event held on August 29, 2010 at Zepp Sapporo in Sapporo, Hokkaido, Japan.

Results

Shooto: Kitazawa Shooto Vol. 4

Shooto: Kitazawa Shooto Vol. 4 was an event held on September 17, 2010 at Kitazawa Town Hall in Tokyo, Japan.

Results

Shooto: The Way of Shooto 5: Like a Tiger, Like a Dragon

Shooto: The Way of Shooto 5: Like a Tiger, Like a Dragon was an event held on September 23, 2010 at Korakuen Hall in Tokyo, Japan.

Results

Shooto: Gig West 12

Shooto: Gig West 12 was an event held on September 26, 2010 at Abeno Ward Hall in Osaka, Kansai, Japan.

Results

Shooto: Shooting Disco 13: Can't Stop Myself!

Shooto: Shooting Disco 13: Can't Stop Myself! was an event held on October 16, 2010 at Shinjuku Face in Tokyo, Japan.

Results

Shooto: Gig Central 21

Shooto: Gig Central 21 was an event held on October 24, 2010 at Asunal Kanayama Hall in Nagoya, Aichi, Japan.

Results

Shooto: The Way of Shooto 6: Like a Tiger, Like a Dragon

Shooto: The Way of Shooto 6: Like a Tiger, Like a Dragon was an event held on November 19, 2010 at Korakuen Hall in Tokyo, Japan.

Results

Shooto: The Rookie Tournament 2010 Final

Shooto: The Rookie Tournament 2010 Final was an event held on December 18, 2010 at Shinjuku Face in Tokyo, Japan.

Results

Shooto: Border: Season 2: Immovable

Shooto: Border: Season 2: Immovable was an event held on December 26, 2010 at Hirano Ward Community Hall in Osaka, Kansai, Japan.

Results

See also 
 Shooto
 List of Shooto champions
 List of Shooto Events

References

Shooto events
2010 in mixed martial arts